Jean-François Boyvin de Bonnetot, or marques Bacqueville (Bacqueville-en-Caux, 1688 - Paris, October 7, 1760/1789), was a French inventor.

On March 19, 1742, he flew in a glider over the river Seine. Jean-Jacques Rousseau observed and recorded the event in his biographical book. He equipped himself with wings and attempted to fly off the roof of the hotel. He briefly hovered 300 meters above the Seine before falling into a barge and breaking his leg.

References

1688 births
18th-century French inventors
18th-century deaths
Year of death missing
18th-century French scientists